Lars Leiro (13 April 1914 –  22 March 2005) was a Norwegian politician for the Centre Party.

He was born in Haus.

He was elected to the Norwegian Parliament from Hordaland in 1958, and was re-elected on two occasions. From August to September 1963 he served as the Minister of Transport and Communications during the short-lived centre-right cabinet Lyng. During his stints as cabinet member his seat in the Parliament was taken by Eilif Åsbo. His career in politics ended with the post of County Governor of Hordaland, which he held from 1966 to 1984.

Leiro was a member of Voss municipality council from 1947 to 1960, serving as mayor in the period 1955–1959. Having grown up in Frekhaug, he had become a farmer in Voss in 1941, from which he stepped down in 1976. He held numerous posts in local and national boards and committees.

References

1914 births
2005 deaths
Members of the Storting
Centre Party (Norway) politicians
Government ministers of Norway
Mayors of places in Hordaland
County governors of Norway
Ministers of Transport and Communications of Norway
20th-century Norwegian politicians